Choo Chiat Goh (born 1939) is a Chinese ballet dancer, choreographer, and the founder of the renowned Goh Ballet Academy, Canada, along with his wife Lin Yee.

Early life 
Goh was born in Singapore, into a family of 10 children. His parents were Chinese, and spoke Mandarin. At the age of 13, he watched The Red Shoes and fell in love with the art form. Next year, he joined the Royal Ballet School in England, and subsequently trained under dancer and choreographer Pyotr Gusev in China. In 1959, he graduated from the Beijing Dance Academy.

Career 
After training, he became a principal dancer at the National Ballet of China. The Cultural Revolution of 1966 - 1976 changed the way ballet was performed in China. He went to Canada to visit his sick mother and remained there, and started the Goh Ballet Academy.

Personal life 
Goh is married to Lin Yee, also a ballet dancer. Their daughter is Chan Hon Goh. One of Goh's sisters, Soonee Goh, trained at the Royal Ballet School in London and co-founded the Singapore Ballet Academy in Singapore. Another sister, Soo Khim Goh, trained at the Australian Ballet School, and was the co-founder of the Singapore Dance Theatre in 1988.

Award 

 2017 - Lifetime Achievement Award - by Vancouver Mayor, Gregor Robertson
2013 - Queen Elizabeth II Diamond Jubilee Medal - by MP Hedy Fry

References 

Living people
1939 births
20th-century births
Chinese ballet dancers
Chinese choreographers